Odeh may refer to:

People

First name

Odeh Ogar (born 1981), Nigerian football player

Surname

Ahmed Odeh (born 1985), Jordanian footballer of Palestinian descent
Alex Odeh (1944–1985), Palestinian American anti-discrimination activist who was killed in a bombing
Ayman Odeh (born 1975), Israeli Arab lawyer and politician
Faris Odeh (1985–2000), Palestinian boy shot dead by the Israel Defense Forces while throwing stones
Lama Abu-Odeh, Palestinian-American professor and author
Mohammed Odeh (born 1965), Palestinian; former al-Qaeda member sentenced to life imprisonment for participation in the 1998 United States embassy bombings
Rasmea Odeh (born 1947 or 1948), Palestinian-American convicted of involvement in a fatal terrorist bombing, and of immigration fraud 
Sheik Odeh (born 1950), Palestinian founder of the Islamic Jihad Movement in Palestine